The 2010–11 Iowa State Cyclones men's basketball team represents Iowa State University during the 2010–11 NCAA Division I men's basketball season. The Cyclones were coached by Fred Hoiberg, who was in his 1st season. They played their home games at Hilton Coliseum in Ames, Iowa and competed in the Big 12 Conference.

Previous season

The Cyclones finished 15–17, and 4–12 in Big 12 play to finish tied for 9th in the regular season conference standings.  They lost to Texas in the first round of the Big 12 tournament.

On April 26, 2010, Greg McDermott announced he was resigning as head coach at Iowa State to take the same position at Creighton.

On April 27, 2010, it was announced that former player Fred Hoiberg would take over as head coach.  After his standout collegiate playing career Hoiberg played 10 years in the NBA.  Prior to his hiring by Iowa State he was most recently an executive with the Minnesota Timberwolves.

Offseason departures

Recruiting

Prep recruits

Incoming transfers

Roster

Schedule and results

|-
!colspan=12 style=|Exhibition
|-

|-
!colspan=12 style=| Regular Season
|-

|-
!colspan=9 style=}| Big 12 tournament
|-

|-

Rankings

*AP does not release post-NCAA tournament rankings

Awards and honors

All-Conference Selections

Diante Garrett (2nd Team)
Scott Christopherson (Honorable Mention)

Ralph A. Olsen Award

Diante Garrett (2009)

References

Iowa State Cyclones men's basketball seasons
Iowa State
Iowa State Cyc
Iowa State Cyc